is a retired Japanese naval officer who served as the 33rd Chief of Staff of the Japanese Maritime Self Defence Force (JMSDF) from 2016 to 2019.

References

1958 births
Living people
People from Kawasaki, Kanagawa
Chiefs of Staff of the Japan Maritime Self-Defense Force
National Defense Academy of Japan alumni
Military personnel from Kanagawa Prefecture